Neophyllaphis is a genus of aphids in the family Aphididae. There are about 18 described species in Neophyllaphis.

Species
These 18 species belong to the genus Neophyllaphis:

 Neophyllaphis araucariae Takahashi, 1937
 Neophyllaphis brimblecombei Carver, 1971
 Neophyllaphis burostris Qiao & Zhang, 2001
 Neophyllaphis cuschensis Nieto Nafría & Delfino, 2008
 Neophyllaphis fransseni Hille Ris Lambers, 1967
 Neophyllaphis gingerensis Carver, 1959
 Neophyllaphis grobleri Eastop, 1955
 Neophyllaphis iuiuyensis Mier Durante & Ortego, 2008
 Neophyllaphis lanata Hales & Lardner, 1988
 Neophyllaphis michelbacheri (Essig, 1953)
 Neophyllaphis podocarpi Takahashi, 1920 (podocarpus aphid)
 Neophyllaphis podocarpini Carrillo, 1980
 Neophyllaphis propinqua Quednau, 2010
 Neophyllaphis pueblohondensis Quednau, 2010
 Neophyllaphis rappardi Hille Ris Lambers, 1967
 Neophyllaphis totarae Cottier, 1953
 Neophyllaphis varicolor Miller & Halbert, 2014
 Neophyllaphis viridis Ilharco, 1973

References

Further reading

 
 

Neophyllaphidinae
Sternorrhyncha genera
Articles created by Qbugbot